Hayley Law (born November 18, 1992) is a Canadian actress and singer, known for her portrayal of Valerie Brown in the CW drama series Riverdale, Lizzie Elliot in the Netflix science fiction series, Altered Carbon, and Tess in the dark comedy film Spontaneous.

Early life and career

Law was born on November 18, 1992 in Vancouver, British Columbia, Canada. She made her acting debut in a recurring role as Valerie Brown on the CW drama series Riverdale. She followed with roles in TV shows and movie, including The Arrangement, Stickman, The New Romantic and Netflix's Altered Carbon.

Filmography

Film

Television

Discography

 Hayleau (EP) – (2016)

References

External links
 
 
 

1992 births
Living people
Actresses from Vancouver
21st-century Canadian actresses
Canadian film actresses
Canadian television actresses
Black Canadian actresses
Canadian people of Jamaican descent